The 2015 NFL Draft was the 80th annual meeting of National Football League (NFL) franchises to select newly eligible football players. It took place in Chicago at the Auditorium Theatre and in Grant Park, from April 30 to May 2. The previous fifty NFL drafts (since 1965) had been held in New York City. The 2015 NFL draft was the first to feature an outdoor component, where fans would be able to see the Commissioner on the Auditorium Theatre stage from across the street in the park; this area was called Draft Town. The Tampa Bay Buccaneers held the right to select first because they had the league's worst record in the previous season. The Arizona Cardinals made the final pick in the draft, commonly called Mr. Irrelevant.

One of the major storylines approaching the NFL draft was the competition between the previous two Heisman Trophy winners, Jameis Winston winning the award in 2013 and Marcus Mariota in 2014. Both were considered excellent prospects and had the potential to become the first overall draft selection. Winston was considered to be a more polished pocket passer and pro-style quarterback, but had several off-the-field issues while playing at Florida State, ranging from a sexual assault allegation to shoplifting incidents.  Mariota was considered a better athlete, the fastest quarterback in the draft, and had a better off-the-field reputation. However, Mariota ran a spread offense at Oregon which typically had not transitioned well from college to the NFL. Although neither was considered a perfectly safe pick, the two quarterbacks were selected first and second overall. This was only the sixth time in NFL history that this has occurred. (1971, 1993, 1998, 1999, 2012, and subsequently 2016 & 2021). It was also the first time that two Heisman trophy winners were selected with the first two  overall picks. All 22 running backs selected no longer play for their original team or have already retired.

Timing changes
Shortly before the draft, the NFL shortened the amount of time for certain selections to be made. The time for seventh-round selections was reduced from five minutes to four minutes; similarly, the time for all compensatory selections, which cannot be traded, was reduced from seven minutes to four minutes.

Early entrants

Seventy-four underclassmen announced their intention to forgo their remaining NCAA eligibility and declare themselves available to be selected in the draft. An additional ten players who graduated but were still eligible to play college football chose to enter the draft, bringing to 84 the total number of players who chose to forgo college eligibility to enter the draft.

Overview
The following is the breakdown of the 256 players selected by position:

 34 Linebackers
 35 Wide receivers
 30 Cornerbacks
 24 Offensive tackles
 23 Defensive ends
 18 Running backs
 4 Full backs
 19 Tight ends
 16 Offensive guards
 16 Safeties
 20 Defensive tackles
 7 Quarterbacks
 6 Centers
 1  Long snapper
 1 Punter

Selection order

The draft order is based generally on each team's record from the previous season, with teams which qualified for the postseason selecting after those which failed to make the playoffs. The Tampa Bay Buccaneers and Tennessee Titans each finished  with league-worst . The Buccaneers were awarded the first pick in round one due to having a worse strength of schedule. The selection order for subsequent rounds follows the order of the first round, except that teams with the similar records (and the same playoff result for playoff teams) rotate selections round-by-round (e.g. the Titans picked first in the second round).

In addition to the seven picks each team is given (one in each round), the league allocated thirty-two (32) supplemental picks at the ends of round 3 through 7, for a total of 256 picks. The supplemental picks are awarded to teams who had net losses of free agent talent from the previous year.

Player selections

Supplemental draft
A supplemental draft was held on July 9, 2015. For each player selected in the supplemental draft, the team forfeits its pick in that round in the draft of the following season. Seven players were available, but only one was selected.

Notable undrafted players

Trades
In the explanations below, (PD) indicates trades completed prior to the start of the draft (i.e. Pre-Draft), while (D) denotes trades that took place during the 2015 draft.

Round one

Round two

Round three

Round four

Round five

Round six

Round seven

Summary

Selections by college athletic conference

Schools with multiple draft selections

Selections by position

Notes

References
General references

Trade references

External links
Official Site
2015 NFL draft at ESPN

National Football League Draft
NFL Draft
Draft
2010s in Chicago
2015 in Illinois
American football in Chicago
NFL Draft
NFL Draft
Events in Chicago